The Young Sailor II is a painting by Henri Matisse from 1906. It is in the collection of the Metropolitan Museum of Art, New York.

Painting style
In this the second version of The Young Sailor, Matisse expresses sharper edges, and brighter, flatter colors than in his earlier version of the painting. Painted in vivid pink, blue, and green, the expression of the sailor is playful and primitive. The sailor's stylized face is a mask, a collection of angles and deep lines.

An icon of Fauve portraiture, The Young Sailor II shows greater simplicity and more distortion than the first version of the painting. Contrary to the first version, the second uses more vivid colors which are more blended and distorted. The figure drawing is more succinct, and made up of fewer lines. The young man has a soft body- his legs lazily straddle widely, his head hangs at a small angle. He has a quick curve for a nose, and youthful lips. The whole figure is so logically condensed that it's hypnotizing. Recently established research indicates the model for Young Sailor II was an eighteen-year-old fisherman named Germain Augustin Barthélémy Montargès (1888–1938).

Overall, between the flat, bold color planes and the simplified figure of the boy, Young Sailor II seems to be a more childlike expression of the first portrait. Many elements of the painting are not articulated totally, but implied, rather. The sailor's footwear is a good example. His booties or shoes are not very visible, it's not clear if he is wearing boots for work or leisure. But the decorative elements are there, simplified as they are. The sailor's hands are also a summation of figurative hands. Painted as large gloves of color, fingers are dashes, his palm is shown on his left hand in one deep v-shape. 

There is a major contrast between the still, mask-like quality of the sailor's face and the wild, frenetic brushstrokes of his clothing. Whereas the sailor's eyebrows, nose, and lips all are painted in concrete, heavy lines, his pants and sweater are composed of moving, wild painted curves and turns. The folds of the jumper  (sweater) alone mimic the rushing, lapping waves of the sea from where the boy probably just returned.

The sailor was painted in Collioure, during Matisse's "fauve summer." He had been painting great self-portraits when he convinced an eighteen-year old fisherman to pose for him. When he returned to Paris, Matisse had both a drawing and a painting of the young man to show. The work Matisse brought back seemed to have been created in a whirlwind.

The first version of the painting is more figurative, the second is more abstract and strategic. Alfred H. Barr Jr. saw in the sailor's face an expression of “almond-eyed charm verging on prettiness.” His theatrical, sweetly aggressive features set against a candy-pink background make this one of the most arresting portraits in the Metropolitan collection. It was donated to the Metropolitan Museum of Art as part of the Jacques and Natasha Gelman Collection, in 1998 (1999.363.41).

The painting is on show in the Metropolitan Museums Gallery 904

References

1906 paintings
Paintings by Henri Matisse
Paintings in the collection of the Metropolitan Museum of Art
Portraits of men